Mythos-Magazin is a magazine published by the University of Düsseldorf since 2005. Published topics have included The Sorrows of Young Werther, other works of Goethe, and the myth of Skanderbeg.

References

External links
 Official website

2005 establishments in Germany
German-language magazines
Literary magazines published in Germany
Magazines established in 2005
Mass media in Düsseldorf
Heinrich Heine University Düsseldorf